Cellchrome was a Japanese rock band under the Being label.

History
In 2015, the band was formed in Nagoya.

In 2016, during their first anniversary of formation, they held a one-man live in music festival Nagoya Electric LadyLand Fits All.

In January 2017, they broadcast on Wednesday their weekly radio program Midnight Chrome on ZIP-FM Station.

In August 2017, they made a debut with single Stand Up Now.

In January 2019, their fifth single Aozolighter debuted into the Top 10 of Oricon Weekly Single charts; it is their most successful single so far.

In February 2019, they held their 1st One Man Concert at Nagoya Quattro.

In June 2019, they made their first guest appearance in anime convention AnimeNEXT.

On 28 April 2021, through official website they've announced disband after one-man live in July 2021.

Members
 Mizki - vocals
  - bass guitar
 Tatsuma - drummer
  - guitarist

Discography

Singles

Anime Soundtracks
Stand Up Now was used as an opening theme for Anime television series Konbini Kareshi
Don't Let Me Down was used as an ending theme for Anime television series Osake wa Fūfu ni Natte kara
Everything OK!! was used as an opening theme for Anime television series Detective Conan
Aozolighter was used as an closing theme for Anime television series Detective Conan

Television appearances
Buzzrhythm (NTV): Don't Let Me Down
Live B (TBS): Everything's Ok!

Interview
Coming Next Artist No.15: Cellchrome
Stand Up Now: 2youmag, Music Review Site "Mikki", Lisani,
Don't Let Me Down: 2youmag, Tracks-Live, Music Review Site "Mikki",
Everything's Okay: Cho-Media, Tracks-Live
Aozolighter: Tracks-Live, Lisani, MusicVoice, Cho-Media

References

External links
Cellchrome official Web site 

 	

Being Inc. artists
Living people
Japanese rock music groups
Japanese pop music groups
Anime musicians
Musical groups established in 2015
2015 establishments in Japan
Year of birth missing (living people)